Huh Chan-mi (born April 6, 1992), is a South Korean singer. Huh made her debut in 2010 as a member of a South Korean co-ed group Coed School. She was also a member of Coed School's female unit F-ve Dolls from 2011 until her departure from the group in February 2012. Huh briefly returned to training and appeared on the survival shows Produce 101 (2016) and Mix Nine (2017). Following these appearances, Huh signed to FirstOne Entertainment as a solo artist in 2020, and released her debut solo single album, Highlight, later that year.

Life and career

1992–2012: Early life and career beginnings
Huh was born on April 6, 1992, in Namyangju, South Korea.

Huh became a trainee in S.M. Entertainment in 2004. She initially trained to become a tenth member of Girls' Generation, however due to the limited-nine member line-up she did not make the final cut of the group because she was too young, and only in seventh grade.  She went to Anyang School of Arts and graduated in 2011.

After leaving SM Entertainment, Huh signed with Core Contents Media and made her official debut in 2010 as a main vocal of the group Coed School. The group debuted with a single "Too Late".  By mid 2011, Coed School split into two sub units: Speed and F-ve Dolls. Huh was part of the latter, along with the remaining three female Coed School members and a new member Eunkyo. The group released two promotional videos for singles "Lip Stains" and "Your Words" in which Huh was the protagonist along with bandmate Lee Soomi and singer Jay Park.  F-ve Dolls released one more single titled "Like This Or That" before Huh's departure from the group and Core Contents Media in 2012.  At the time, Huh wrote on Twitter that she was in the process of looking for another agency.

2013–2018: Further training, Produce 101 and Mix Nine 
Huh joined Pledis Entertainment as a trainee for a brief period of time in 2013.  She performed in one of the Like Seventeen concert shows on Seventeen TV along other Pledis trainees . Shortly after, she left the company and joined Duble Kick Entertainment.  In 2016, Huh joined the Mnet survival show Produce 101 to compete against 101 other female K-pop trainees. She placed in the "A" category after her first evaluation and made it into the final 35 contestants, thus being able to record a song for release. Huh was eliminated from the show in the 10th episode, landing in 26th place.  In an interview from March 2019, Huh alleged that the show was edited to create a bad impression of her.

In 2016, Duble Kick's own survival show "Finding Momoland" began airing on Mnet, to form a new girl group called Momoland.  Huh did not take part in the show as she was to debut in a different girlgroup.  In November, Huh featured on MC Mong's album U.F.O on the album track "And You".  The song also featured singer New-a, Huh's future bandmate in the girlgroup High Color from Mostable Music.  The four-member group joined YG Entertainment's survival show Mix Nine where she recorded a song produced by MC Mong titled  "Like a Star". Huh was eliminated from Mix Nine in the 13th episode with her final rank being 20th place.  Soon after the show ended, Huh left High Color and did not make any public appearances in 2018.

In February 2019, Huh graduated from Dongduk Women's University after seven years, majoring in practical music.

2020–present: Solo career 
In January 2020, Huh signed a contract with FirstOne Entertainment and started a personal YouTube channel, under her new romanized stage name Huh Chan Mi. Her first video was a cover of "Señorita" by Camila Cabello and Shawn Mendes, which was popular in South Korea. In June, it was announced that Huh was preparing to release an album the following month.  Huh released the self-composed song, "I'm fine thanks", along with a performance trailer on July 9, as a pre-release before her solo album. The song was reported to be about how Huh had to overcome difficulties and grow in the entertainment industry while hiding her unhappiness.  Huh released her solo album Highlight on July 23 along with first single "Lights".

Discography

Single albums 
 Highlight (2020)
 Chanmi's Trot: Haeundae Beach (2021)

Singles

Featured artist

Compilation appearances

Filmography

Television

References 

1992 births
Living people
MBK Entertainment artists
People from Namyangju
21st-century South Korean singers
South Korean women pop singers
South Korean female idols
Produce 101 contestants
21st-century South Korean women singers
Mix Nine contestants